Dr. Christopher Temporelli is an American operatic bass and concert singer, radio host, TV personality, personal development coach, speaker, and creator/author of the FLOW Freedom Laws of the World system and book.

Life and career 
Christopher Temporelli's professional opera debut was in 2005 with the Fort Worth Opera in Bass Performance Hall. He won the Norman Carlberg Award from the LiederKranz Society in 2006 with award recital in Weill Hall, Carnegie Hall.  Also in 2006, he was presented the Andy Anselmo Achievement Award at New York City's Hudson Theatre onstage with award winners Licia Albanese and Carol Channing.  As part of the Young American Artists Program at the GlimmerGlass Opera, Christopher sang the roles of Plutone in Christopher Alden's production of Monteverdi's L'Orfeo and the Judge in Philip Glass's Orphée.

His Canadian mainstage debut with Toronto Canada's Opera Atelier was reviewed by The Globe and Mail as "clearly one to watch, he is the total package, a good-looking singer with a strong resonant voice."  Christopher later joined the roster of New York City Opera and appears in numerous opera and concert performances around the world including Virginia Opera, Opera Saratoga (formerly Lake George Opera), Syracuse Opera, Opera Memphis, The Washington Chorus at the Kennedy Center, New Choral Society, Princeton Pro Musica, National Arts Centre Orchestra Ottawa, Seoul Arts Center, Sejong Center, and many others.

Christopher completed a doctor of Musical Arts with Shirley Verrett and George Shirley at the University of Michigan. He coached with Armen Boyajian ( whose studio has included Samuel Ramey and Paul Plishka ) Andy Anselmo, Mario Rossi and Stephen Sulich in NYC.

In 2018, he founded Apollo Naturopathics LLC as the platform for coaching and seminars.  His book, FLOW Freedom Laws of the World "Catch the Wave" to your Current of Creativity is available on Amazon.com and in India published in a version by the Times of India.

Christopher is on the roster of Robert Gilder & Co Management.

References

Footnotes

External links
 official website
 company website
 recording
 Pine Mountain profile
 barihunks

Living people
American opera singers
Operatic basses
University of Michigan alumni
Year of birth missing (living people)
American singers